Bindal (Bendalgubba, Nyawaygi) is an extinct Australian Aboriginal language of North Queensland. The Bindal language region included the area from Cape Cleveland extending south towards Ayr and the mouth of the Burdekin River, encompassing the landscape within the boundaries of the Townsville City Council and Burdekin Shire Council.

Classification 
Bowern suggests that it might have been a Maric language. Breen presumes that one of two Lower Burdekin languages, which he concluded were not Maric, is Bindal.

Vocabulary 
Some words from the Bindal language, as spelt and written by Bindal authors include:

 Adha: yes
 Andha: saltwater
 Bagaraga: star
 Barri: stone
 Bugan: grass
 Gadhara: possum
 Gamu: water
 Gunbana: blood

See also 

 Bindal people

References

External links 
 Bibliography of Bindal people and language resources, at the Australian Institute of Aboriginal and Torres Strait Islander Studies

Maric languages
Extinct languages of Queensland

Pama–Nyungan languages